The Copa Suecia (in English: Sweden Cup) was an official Argentine football cup competition held once from 1958 to 1960 by the Argentine Football Association (AFA). It was competed by clubs in the Primera División Argentina. Atlanta won the tournament in the final held in 1960.

History
Given that the World Cup was held in faraway Sweden in 1958, the Argentine league competition was interrupted after the third round and it was not restarted until three months later. As a result, AFA organized a cup competition in order to keep the teams in readiness and also let the clubs receive some economic benefits throughout the prolonged intermission. The Swedish Embassy in Argentina donated the trophy and hence the name of the tournament.

The 16 teams of the Primera División were divided into two groups (A and B), and each group played a round-robin. The top team from each group would contest a single-legged final. If two teams had the same number of points in a group, a single-legged play-off would be competed to determine the qualification.

Atlanta started very well in this year by three consecutive wins in the league. It also made a strong debut in the Group B of the Copa Suecia by defeating River Plate 4–1. Eventually it was the top team of its group, having the same number of points with Rosario Central. A play-off was contested and Atlanta won by 1–0.

Racing Club was the qualified team in the Group A and they played the final in 1960. Atlanta won the match 3:1 and was crowned the champion. It remains the only official top flight tournament title in Atlanta's history. Moreover, it was the first time that one of the so-called "little teams" of Argentina won an official cup in the professional era, aside from the "Big Five" (River Plate, Boca Juniors, San Lorenzo de Almagro, Independiente, and Racing Club).

Initially, the tournament drew strong crowds. However, public interest declined soon due to various factors. The competition was harmed by the lack of commitment of some of the competing clubs that presented too many substitutes. Moreover, interest was lost due to the dismal performance of the Argentina national football team in World Cup 1958. Last but not least, once the Primera División was resumed, there was a lack of available match dates and the scheduling of the remaining part of the tournament became very difficult. As a result, the tournament became a prolongated competition, with some matches played in 1959 and the final was held in 1960, two years and nine days after the commencement.

Group stage

Group A

Grupo B

Tie breaking play-off

Final

Details

|style="vertical-align:top; width:50%"|

|}

Top goalscorer 
Source:

References

S
1958 in Argentine football
1959 in Argentine football
1960 in Argentine football
Suecia
Football in Buenos Aires